"More than Love" is the fourth single from Scottish band Wet Wet Wet's fourth studio album, High on the Happy Side (1992). It was released on 9 March 1992, reaching number 19 on the UK Singles Chart and number nine in the Netherlands.

Track listings
 7-inch and cassette single
 "More than Love" (ET mix) – 4:25
 "Goodnight Girl" (Rhythm mix) – 3:39

 CD1
 "More than Love" (ET mix) – 4:25
 "Sweet Little Mystery" (Memphis Sessions) – 3:37
 "Broke Away" – 4:47
 "Goodnight Girl" (Rhythm mix) – 3:39

 CD2
 "More than Love" (ET mix) – 4:25
 "Make It Tonight" (ET mix) – 4:18
 "This Time" (Memphis Sessions) – 4:19
 "Perfect Lie" – 3:53

Charts

References

Wet Wet Wet songs
1992 singles
1992 songs
Songs written by Graeme Clark (musician)
Songs written by Marti Pellow
Songs written by Neil Mitchell (musician)
Songs written by Tommy Cunningham